Edward Norton (October 29, 1808 – May 2, 1872) was an American lawyer and Associate Justice of the Supreme Court of California from January 2, 1862, to January 2, 1864.

Biography
Born in Canandaigua, New York, Norton received a liberal arts education at Union College. After his admission to the Bar, he practiced law for several years in Buffalo, and then in the New York City. In 1849, he moved to California and practiced in San Francisco. In 1851, he served as a member of the Whig Party central committee in Sacramento.

Also in 1851, he was appointed Reporter of Decisions, and began drafting his reports. But after his drafts were destroyed in a city fire on May 4, 1851, he resigned from the position, and was replaced by Nathaniel Bennett.

In November 1852, the Democratic Party nominated Norton for Judge of the San Francisco county District Court, running against the Whig candidate, Delos Lake, who won by merely 21 votes. In June 1854, Governor John Bigler appointed Norton as a Judge of the Twelfth District Court, to stand at the next election. In September 1854, Norton was elected on the ticket of both the Democratic Party and Know Nothings to a full term on that Court. On December 16, 1860, having continued on the District bench for a full term of six years, he retired on account of his health, which had become seriously impaired.

Norton determined to visit to Europe, intending to be absent several years. After his arrival in Europe, and without his knowledge, he was elected to the Supreme Court of California on the Republican Party ticket. On receiving the news, he returned to California to commence his term in January 1862. Chief Justice Stephen Johnson Field described Norton as a skilled trial court judge who was unsuited to the appellate bench. In October 1863, elections were held for all seats on the Supreme Court due to an 1862 amendment to the California constitution and 1863 enabling law, and Norton chose to retire rather than seek re-election.

One anecdote from Norton's service on the court involves him giving a young lawyer an examination for admission to the bar:

On May 2, 1872, Norton died while on a trip to London, England.

References

External links
California Supreme Court Historical Society page on Edward Norton
Past & Present Justices. California State Courts. Retrieved July 19, 2017.

See also
 List of justices of the Supreme Court of California
 California Reporter of Decisions
 Stephen Johnson Field
 Edwin B. Crocker
 Warner Cope

1807 births
1872 deaths
Politicians from Canandaigua, New York
Union College (New York) alumni
Politicians from Buffalo, New York
Justices of the Supreme Court of California
Superior court judges in the United States
U.S. state supreme court judges admitted to the practice of law by reading law
Lawyers from San Francisco
19th-century American lawyers
19th-century American judges
California Know Nothings
California Republicans
California Democrats
Lawyers from Buffalo, New York